"Enemies" is the third single from American rock band Shinedown's fourth studio album, Amaryllis.

Release
The song was released on July 17, 2012.

Track listing

Music video
The video shows the band sitting in a private meeting, in an open and empty room. The lyrics in the song simulate the dialogue, and how it causes the resulting "fight" that ensues.

As of December 1, 2022, the song has 59 million views on YouTube.

In popular culture
This song was used as the opening theme for WWE Raw from July 25, 2016 to January 22, 2018, as well as being featured in the WWE 2K18 video game.

Charts

Weekly charts

Year-end charts

References

2012 singles
Shinedown songs
2012 songs
Songs written by Dave Bassett (songwriter)
Songs written by Brent Smith
Song recordings produced by Rob Cavallo
Atlantic Records singles
WWE Raw
Songs written by Eric Bass